Same Truck is the fifth studio album by American country music artist Scotty McCreery, and his second album with Triple Tigers. Its lead single, "You Time", is McCreery's fourth consecutive single to reach number one on the US Country Airplay chart.

Content 
The album is the second to be released by McCreery under Triple Tigers. McCreery co-wrote ten of the album's twelve tracks.

Critical reception 
Pip Ellwood-Hughes of Entertainment Focus wrote that the album's lyrics "cover the usual topics of trucks, romance and small towns" and that it "isn’t a reinvention of the wheel but it’s designed to hit McCreery’s hardcore fanbase, which it will most definitely do."

Commercial performance 
Same Truck debuted at number 10 on the Top Country Albums chart, marking it as his fifth consecutive album to debut within the top 10 on the chart.

Track listing

Personnel 
Vocals
 Scotty McCreery - lead vocals
 Wes Hightower - background vocals
 Aaron Eshuis - background vocals
 Russell Terrell - background vocals

Musicians
 Ilya Toshinskiy - acoustic guitar, banjo, bouzouki, mandolin, dulcimer
 Shannon Forrest - drums, percussion
 Derek Wells - electric guitar, slide guitar
 Jimmie Lee Sloas - bass guitar
 David Dorn - piano, synthesizer, accordion, B3, Wurlitzer
 Mike Johnson - pedal steel guitar
 J.T. Corenflos - electric guitar
 Gordon Mote - piano

Production
 Derek Wells - programming
 Justin Niebank - programming
 Aaron Eshuis - programming

Charts

References 

2021 albums
Albums produced by Frank Rogers (record producer)
Scotty McCreery albums
Thirty Tigers albums